Townsendia is a genus of robber flies in the family Asilidae. There are about 13 described species in Townsendia.

Species
These 13 species belong to the genus Townsendia:

 Townsendia albomacula Martin, 1966 i c g b
 Townsendia araguensis Kaletta, 1976 c g
 Townsendia arenicola Scarbrough, 1995 c g b
 Townsendia argyrata Curran, 1926 c g
 Townsendia dilata Martin, 1966 i c g
 Townsendia fiebrigii Bezzi, 1909 c g
 Townsendia gracilis Martin, 1966 c g
 Townsendia minuta Williston, 1895 i c g
 Townsendia nemacula Martin, 1966 c g
 Townsendia nigra Back, 1909 i c g b
 Townsendia podexargenteus Enderlein, 1914 c g
 Townsendia pulcherrima Back, 1909 i c g
 Townsendia triangulata Martin, 1966 c g

Data sources: i = ITIS, c = Catalogue of Life, g = GBIF, b = Bugguide.net

References

Further reading

External links

 
 

Asilidae